The Renaissance Resort at World Golf Village is a golf resort located in St. Augustine, Florida.  It is part of Renaissance Hotels brand which is managed by Marriott.

Situated within the World Golf Village, the resort is home to a hotel, restaurants, spa, two golf courses, the World Golf Hall of Fame, PGA Tour Golf Academy, and an IMAX theater.

Golf
There are two golf courses within the resort, the King & Bear, which is the only course to have been co-designed by Arnold Palmer and Jack Nicklaus, and the Slammer & Squire, designed by Bobby Weed with consultation from Sam Snead and Gene Sarazen.

External links
Renaissance Resort at World Golf Village Home Page
Renaissance Hotels Official Site
The Official World Golf Village Website and Hall of Fame

Golf clubs and courses in Florida
Golf clubs and courses designed by Jack Nicklaus
Tourist attractions in St. Augustine, Florida
Buildings and structures in St. Augustine, Florida
Hotels in the Jacksonville metropolitan area